Deggendorf is an electoral constituency (German: Wahlkreis) represented in the Bundestag. It elects one member via first-past-the-post voting. Under the current constituency numbering system, it is designated as constituency 227. It is located in southeastern Bavaria, comprising the districts of Deggendorf and Freyung-Grafenau.

Deggendorf was created for the inaugural 1949 federal election. Since 2017, it has been represented by Thomas Erndl of the Christian Social Union (CSU).

Geography
Deggendorf is located in southeastern Bavaria. As of the 2021 federal election, it comprises the districts of Deggendorf and Freyung-Grafenau as well as the municipalities of Aicha vorm Wald, Eging am See, Fürstenstein, and Hofkirchen from the Passau district.

History
Deggendorf was created in 1949. In the 1949 election, it was Bavaria constituency 13 in the numbering system. In the 1953 through 1961 elections, it was number 208. In the 1965 through 1998 elections, it was number 213. In the 2002 and 2005 elections, it was number 228. Since the 2009 election, it has been number 227.

Originally, the constituency comprised the independent city of Deggendorf and the districts of Landkreis Deggendorf, Kötzting, Regen, and Viechtach. In the 1965 through 1972 elections, it also contained the district of Grafenau. In the 1976 through 2013 elections, it comprised the districts of Deggendorf and Freyung-Grafenau. It acquired its current borders in the 2017 election.

Members
The constituency has been held by the Christian Social Union (CSU) during all but one Bundestag term since its creation. It was first represented by Ludwig Volkholz of the Bavaria Party (BP) from 1949 to 1953. Stefan Dittrich won it for the CSU in 1953, and served until 1972. He was succeeded by Franz Handlos from 1972 to 1987. Handlos was elected for the CSU in each of his four terms, but left the party in 1983 to co-found The Republicans. After losing the leadership of the party, he founded the Freedom People's Party (FVP) in 1985. He was defeated in 1987 by CSU candidate Bartholomäus Kalb. Kalb was then representative from 1987 to 2017, a total of eight consecutive terms. Thomas Erndl was elected in 2017 and re-elected in 2021.

Election results

2021 election

2017 election

2013 election

2009 election

Notes

References

Federal electoral districts in Bavaria
1949 establishments in West Germany
Constituencies established in 1949
Deggendorf (district)
Freyung-Grafenau
Passau (district)